Nikos Kostakis (born 16 February 1973) is a Greek professional football (soccer) goalkeeper, currently playing for Thrasivoulos Filis F.C. in the Greek second division. Before Kostakis joined the club, he played for Akratitos, joining in 2004 from GS Neos Panionios, and having previously played for Nafpaktiakos Asteras, Ethnikos Asteras and APO Panargeiakos from 1991 through 2000.

Kostakis has never, throughout his long career, been the first choice goalkeeper at any of his clubs. In his first year at Akratitos he played 25 games, the most he has played in one year at any point in his career, although currently he is second choice to the former Romanian international Bogdan Stelea.

References

1973 births
Living people
Footballers from Athens
Greek footballers
Ethnikos Asteras F.C. players
Panionios F.C. players
A.P.O. Akratitos Ano Liosia players
Thrasyvoulos F.C. players
Association football goalkeepers